Kurt Ott (9 December 1912 – 19 April 2001) was a cyclist from  Switzerland. He won the silver medal in the team road race at the 1936 Summer Olympics along with Ernst Nievergelt and Edgar Buchwalder.

References

1912 births
2001 deaths
Swiss male cyclists
Olympic cyclists of Switzerland
Olympic silver medalists for Switzerland
Cyclists at the 1936 Summer Olympics
Olympic medalists in cycling
Cyclists from Zürich
Medalists at the 1936 Summer Olympics